John Benson (born July 2, 1959) is a former professional tennis player from the United States.

Benson enjoyed most of his tennis success while playing doubles. During his career, he won 3 doubles titles. He achieved a career-high doubles ranking of No. 52 in 1982.

Career finals

Doubles (3 wins)

External links
 
 

American male tennis players
Trinity Tigers men's tennis players
1959 births
Living people
Place of birth missing (living people)